Mondo Meyer Upakhyan (Bengali: মন্দ মেয়ের উপাখ্যান) is a 2002 Indian Bengali-language film directed and written by Buddhadev Dasgupta. The film was also released under the English title A Tale of A Naughty Girl and French title Chroniques Indiennes. The film stars Samata Das in the titular role. It also stars Tapas Paul, Rituparna Sengupta, Sreelekha Mitra, Sudipta Chakraborty and June Malia. The film won National Film Award for Best Feature Film in 2003.

Plot
Based on a short story by Bengali writer Prafulla Roy, the central idea developed by director Dasgupta, tells the story of a girl, Lati (Samata Das), whose mother Rajani (Rituparna Sengupta) is a prostitute living and working in a brothel in rural India. Rajani plans to offer her daughter to an older man, a rich husband and protector to her daughter. Lati, however, wants to return to school and finish her studies. Unwilling to pay such a price for material success, she runs away to Calcutta. The discovery of this new world is described parallel to other stories of emancipation, such as that of three young prostitutes, of an aged couple going nowhere and man's landing on the moon. In a surrealistic approach typical of the director, a clumsy cat and an intelligent donkey are also present in the film.

Ganesh (Tapas Paul) works full-time as a driver for wealthy Bengali-speaking, Natabar Paladhi (Ram Gopal Bajaj), who lives in a mansion with his wife, children and grandchildren, and runs 'Anjali Cinema' He has Ganesh use his vehicle as a private taxi cab. Amongst Ganesh's customers are a woman named Bakul (June Malia), who alights near a town of Gosaipara to take up prostitution with Jamunabai; an abandoned elderly couple who are in need of hospitalization — there is none in the vicinity, and they end up secretly riding with Ganesh all the time; while Natabar uses this vehicle to travel to Gosaipara to visit a prostitute named Rajani and negotiate with her so that he can have her 14-year-old daughter, Lati, as his mistress. Things get complicated when Lati rebels against her mother so she can return to school, and a prostitute is about to get killed by her vengeful husband.

Cast

Samata Das as Lati
Tapas Paul as Ganesh
Rituparna Sengupta as Rajani
 Sreelekha Mitra as Ayesha
 Sudipta Chakraborty as Basanti
 June Malia as Bakul
 Arpan Basar as Shibu
 Ram Gopal Bajaj as Natabar Paladhi
 Pradip Mukherjee as Nagen
 Pavan Bandhopadhyay
 Debjani Biswas
 Kajol Chowdhuri
 Ketaki Dutta
 Arjun Guha Thakurta
 Saroj Gupta
 Fakir Das Kumar
 Subrata Mukherjee
 Anup Mukhyopadhyay

Crew
 Directed: Buddhadev Dasgupta
 Screenplay: Buddhadev Dasgupta
 Produced: Arya Bhattacharjee
 Music: Buddhadev Dasgupta
 Cinematography: Venu
 Film Editing: Raviranjan Maitra
 Art Direction: Kousik Sarkar

Promotion
Directors like Dasgupta (and others of his ilk like Adoor Gopalakrishnan or Mrinal Sen) make movies that are very specific to their own cultural milieu. A great master like the late Satyajit Ray was never comfortable when he stepped outside his native Bengal with his camera. So too Dasgupta. His latest work, Mondo Meyer Upakhyan (A Tale of a Naughty Girl), is set in his favourite Purulia, a backward region in West Bengal. Beyond these main travails of Lati, Dasgupta presents a gripping account of village life. On Dasgupta's canvas, one witnesses life in all its splendour. A Tale of a Naughty Girl is undoubtedly a piece of celluloid that elevates cinema to another realm. It is extremely positive, and probably comes from a deep sense of peace and tranquillity that Dasgupta must have achieved from his poetic inclination.

Released

Awards
2003: Anandalok Awards – Best Director – Buddhadeb Dasgupta
2003: Best ASEAN Film Award – Buddhadev Dasgupta
2003: National Film Award for Best Feature Film – Arya Bhattacharya (Producer),  Buddhadev Dasgupta (Director)

References

External links
 
www.arjoe.com

2002 films
Bengali-language Indian films
2000s Bengali-language films
2002 drama films
Films directed by Buddhadeb Dasgupta
Best Feature Film National Film Award winners